Soulin'  is an album by blues musician Jimmy Reed released by the BluesWay label in 1967.

Reception

AllMusic reviewer Stephen Thomas Erlewine stated the album was: "bogged down by a production that tries to move Reed into the blues-rock era. Consequently, the album is primarily of interest to completists, since even hardcore Reed fans may find the production disconcerting".

Track listing
All compositions credited to Al Smith except where noted
 "Buy Me a Hound Dog" – 2:30
 "Feel Like I Want to Ramble" – 2:35
 "I Wake Up at Daybreak" – 2:16
 "Peepin' and Hidin'" – 2:36
 "Don't Press Your Luck Woman" – 2:28
 "I'm Not Going to Let You Down" – 2:35
 "I'm Knockin' on Your Door" – 2:40
 "Crazy About Oklahoma" – 2:40
 "Cousin Peaches" – 2:07
 "Ain't No Time for Fussin'" –	2:42
 "Dedication to Sonny" – 1:57
Recorded in Chicago in May 1966 (tracks 7-9 & 11), May 26, 1967 (tracks 1, 2, 4 & 5) and April 18, 1967 (tracks 3, 6 & 10)

Personnel
Jimmy Reed – guitar, vocals, harmonica
William "Lefty" Bates (all tracks), Eddie Taylor (tracks 7-9 & 11) – guitar
Jimmy Gresham (tracks 1-6 & 10), Jimmy Reed Jr (tracks 7-9 & 11), Phil Upchurch (tracks 7-9 & 11) – bass
Al Duncan – drums

References

Jimmy Reed albums
1967 albums
BluesWay Records albums